Elachista platina is a moth of the family Elachistidae. It is found in the Australian Capital Territory.

The larvae feed on Joycea pallida. They mine the leaves of their host plant. The mine is initially straight and narrow, but gradually widens and reaches a length of about 200 mm. The frass is deposited in a dense block at the rear end of the mine. Pupation takes place outside of the mine on a leaf or twig of the host plant.

References

Moths described in 2011
platina
Moths of Australia